Try Love is a studio album by Amii Stewart, first released in Italy in 1984. It includes singles "That Loving Feeling" (written by Tony Joe White), "I Gotta Have You Back" and "Try Love".

After the commercial success of the non-album single "Friends" in 1985, the album was re-released internationally with an extended remix of the song replacing the track "Mother Mary."  Certain original (1984) versions of the album had already included the original (non-extended) version of "Friends" as an additional (fifth) track on Side A, maintaining "Mother Mary" as the final track on the album.

Try Love has been reissued on the MP3 download format.

Track listing

Side A:
"That Loving Feeling" (Tony Joe White) (4:33)
"Try Love" (Charlie Cannon, Mike Francis) (4:00)
"Dangerous Rhythm" (John Foxx) (4:40)
"Losing Control" (Randy Hebert) (4:42)
"Friends" (Mike Francis) (4:30) **Only appeared on certain editions of the album

Side B: 
"I Gotta Have you Back" (Cannon, Francis) (4:25)
"High Dimension" (Amii Stewart, Salvatore "Toti" Vitale) (4:00)
"Fever Line" (Stewart, Vitale) (4:54)
"Dance Till You Get Enough" (Laszlo Benker, Leslie Mándoki, Timothy Touchton) (3:23)
"Mother Mary" (Harold "Lally" Stott, Mario & Giosy Capuano) (3:47)

Personnel
 Amii Stewart - vocals on all tracks

"That Loving Feeling"
Sandro Centofanti- keyboards
Fabio Pignatelli- bass
Giancarlo Maurino- saxophone
Mike Francis- Linn Drum programming, backing vocals
Paul Micioni- Linn Drum programming
Charlie Cannon, Douglas Meakin- backing vocals

"Try Love"
Sandro Centofanti- piano, keyboards
Dino D'Autorio- bass
Agostino Marangolo- drums
Mike Francis, Charlie Cannon, Douglas Meakin- backing vocals

"Dangerous Rhythm"
Romano Musumarra- keyboards
Marco Rinalduzzi- guitar
Fabio Pignatelli- bass
Walter Martino- drums

"Losing Control"
Sandro Centofanti- Fender piano, keyboards
Carlo Pennisi- guitar
Dino D'Autorio- bass
Agostino Marangolo- drums

"Friends"
Mike Francis- guest vocals, Linn drum, Drumulator, backing vocals
Paul Micioni- Linn drum, Drumulator
Sandro Centofanti (??; too small to read on images)- keyboards
Charlie Cannon, Douglas Meakin- backing vocals
 (see "more images" for the album)

"I Gotta Have You Back"
Romano Musumarra- keyboards
Mike Francis- keyboard bass, Linn Drum programming
Fabio Pignatelli- bass guitar
Walter Martino- percussion
Paul Micioni- Linn Drum programming
Mike Francis, Charlie Cannon, Douglas Meakin- backing vocals

"High Dimension"
Sandro Centofanti- keyboards
Walter Martino- drums
Mike Francis, Charlie Cannon, Toti Vitale- backing vocals

"Fever Line"
Romano Musumarra- keyboards
Sandro Centofanti- keyboards
Fabio Pignatelli- bass
Giancarlo Maurino- saxophone
Walter Martino- drums

"Dance Till You Get Enough"
Laszlo Benker- keyboards
Sandro Centofanti- keyboard bass
Leslie Mandoki- drums, percussion
Walter Martino- drums, percussion

"Mother Mary"
Sandro Centofanti- piano, keyboards
Walter Martino- drums

Production

All tracks Except B4
Paolo Micioni- Producer
Mike Francis- Arranger

Track B4
Produced and arranged by Laszlo Benker and Leslie Mandoki

Alternative album editions
Try Love (international version): "Friends" (Extended Remix), recorded 1985 replacing "Mother Mary".

References

1984 albums
1985 albums
Amii Stewart albums
RCA Victor albums